A Night Like This may refer to:

Theatre and film
 A Night Like This (play), a 1930 British farce, the seventh of the eleven Aldwych farces
 A Night Like This (film), a 1932 British comedy film directed by Tom Walls, based on the play

Music
 A Night Like This (album), a 1993 album by Rebecka Törnqvist
 "A Night Like This" (song), a 2009 song by Caro Emerald
 "A Night Like This", a song from the album The Head on the Door by The Cure

See also
Night Like This (disambiguation)
Nights Like This (disambiguation)